Bettina d'Andrea, (b. in Bologna – d. 1355) was an Italian legal scholar and professor in law and philosophy at the university of Padua. 

As the daughter of Giovanni d'Andrea, professor in Canon law at the university of Bologna, she was educated by her father. She married Giovanni di San Giorgio, a professor at the university of Padua, and became active there as his colleague. 

Her sister, Novella d'Andrea, taught law at the university at Bologna until her death.    

Bettina's grave states in Latin: "sepulcrum domine bitine, filie qdam [quondam] domini iohanis andrea de bononia archidoctoris decretorum [et] uxoris domini iohanis de sancto georgio de bononia doctoris decreto[rum] que obiit anno domini MCCCLV die lune quinto octubris". This roughly translates into English as:
"The grave of Lady Bettina, daughter of master Giovanni d’Andrea from Bologna, great doctor in law, and wife of master Giovanni di San Giorgio from Bologna, doctor in law, who died in 1355, Monday 5th October."

References 
 Jennifer S. Uglow, The Macmillan Dictionary of Women's Biography, Macmillan, 1982, 

1335 deaths
Jurists from Bologna
14th-century Italian women
Canon law jurists
Academic staff of the University of Padua
Year of birth unknown
14th-century educators
14th-century Italian jurists